Marian Dean Beța (born 11 May 1991 in Reșița) is a Romanian footballer who plays as a defender for CSA Steaua București.

Honours
Juventus București
Liga II: 2016–17

Steaua București
Liga III: 2020–21

References

External links 

 
 

1991 births
Living people
Sportspeople from Reșița
Romanian footballers
Romania under-21 international footballers
Association football defenders
CSM Reșița players
FC Sportul Studențesc București players
FC Petrolul Ploiești players
ASC Daco-Getica București players
CS Mioveni players
CSA Steaua București footballers
Liga I players
Liga II players